Danford B. "Danny" Greene (June 26, 1928 – August 13, 2015) was an American film and television editor with about twenty five feature film credits. He was nominated for the Academy Award for Best Film Editing for MASH (1970-directed by Robert Altman) and, with John C. Howard, for Blazing Saddles (1974-directed by Mel Brooks).

Greene graduated from the University of Southern California in 1952. After assisting at Metro Goldwyn Mayer, he became the head of sound editing at Universal Studios, where he worked on Psycho (1960). In the 1960s Greene worked mostly as an editor for episodes of television series such as Thriller and Judd, for the Defense. He broke into feature films with That Cold Day in the Park (1969), which was directed by Robert Altman. The following year he edited MASH (1970) with Altman, which was an anti-war comedy that became a phenomenal success while the U.S. was still fighting the Vietnam War. The film was the third highest-grossing film in the U.S. in 1970, making more than $36 million in the U.S. on a budget of $3 million. Editing was an important aspect of the film's success. The film spawned a long-running television series, and in 1996 was listed on the National Film Registry.

Following MASH Greene worked regularly editing feature films through 1994, although he did not work with Robert Altman again. He directed one feature film The Secret Diary of Sigmund Freud (1984). Other films edited by Greene include Blazing Saddles (1974), Fun with Dick and Jane (1977), American Hot Wax (1978), and Rocky II (1979). Greene's last feature credit was for There Goes My Baby (1994), which was his fourth collaboration with director Floyd Mutrux. He then taught editing at the American Film Institute and the Los Angeles Film School.

Very early in his editing career, Greene was nominated for the American Cinema Editors Eddie award for a 1962 episode of the television series It's a Man's World. Greene's editing of MASH (1970) was widely recognized, and he was nominated for the Academy Award, the BAFTA Award and the Eddie award for the film. He was again nominated for the Academy Award for Blazing Saddles (1974).

References

Further reading
 Tribute video by Mario J. Novoa compiled in 2015.
 Obituary Danford B. Greene

External links 

 

University of Southern California alumni
American film editors
1928 births
2015 deaths